Ector Independent School District is a public school district based in Ector, Texas, United States.

In 2009, the school district was rated "recognized" by the Texas Education Agency.

Schools
Ector Junior High/High School (Grades 7-12)
Ector Elementary School (Grades K-6)
Ector Pre-School

References

External links

School districts in Fannin County, Texas